Paradiplectanum is a genus of monopisthocotylean monogeneans in the family Diplectanidae.
All its species are parasites on marine perciform fishes of the family Sillaginidae.

Species
According to the World Register of Marine Species, there are only two species in the genus:

 Paradiplectanum blairense (Gupta & Khanna, 1974) Domingues & Boeger, 2008 
 Paradiplectanum sillagonum (Tripathi, 1959) Domingues & Boeger, 2008

References

Diplectanidae
Monogenea genera
Parasites of fish